The Chenghua Emperor (9 December 1447 – 9 September 1487), personal name Zhu Jianshen, was the ninth Emperor of the Ming dynasty, who reigned from 1464 to 1487. His era name "Chenghua" means "accomplished change".

Childhood
Zhu Jianshen was a son of the Zhengtong Emperor (also known as the Tianshun Emperor). He was only two years old when his father was captured by the Oirat Mongols and held captive in 1449. After that, his uncle, the Jingtai Emperor, took over the throne whilst his father was released from Oirats and returned to Beijing in 1450 and was put under house arrest for almost seven years. During this time, Zhu Jianshen lived under his uncle's shadow and even had his title of crown prince removed while the Jingtai Emperor installed his own son as heir. Zhu Jianshen was only reinstated as crown prince on the eve of the death of the Jingtai Emperor in 1457.

Reign as emperor
The Chenghua Emperor ascended the throne at the age of 17. During the early part of his administration, he carried out new government policies to reduce tax and strengthen the Ming dynasty. However these did not last and by the closing years of his reign, governmental affairs once again fell into the hands of eunuchs, notably Wang Zhi. Peasant uprisings occurred throughout the country; however, they were violently suppressed. The Chenghua Emperor's reign was also more autocratic than his predecessors' and freedom was sharply curtailed when the emperor established institutes such as the Western Depot (to complement the existing Eastern Depot), monitoring all civilians' actions and words. This institute, not unlike a spy agency, would administer punishment to those whom they suspected of treason. The Western Depot would eventually be shut down but it was the start of a dangerous trend and the Chenghua Emperor's descendants would again revive the Western Depot during the 16th century.

Consort Wan
The Chenghua Emperor spent most of his reign under the influence of Consort Wan, an imperial concubine who was seventeen years older than him. Lady Wan had been a mother figure to the young emperor, rearing and protecting the young prince. After he ascended the throne, she quickly became the emperor's favourite consort. She gave birth to a child in 1466, but he died shortly thereafter. She would come to dominate the Emperor's harem for nearly two decades. Lady Wan would employ eunuchs to oversee the harem and report back to her if any concubines became pregnant. Tactics including the forced abortions and even murders of members of the harem resulted in the Chenghua Emperor lamenting that by the age of thirty-one he still lacked a male heir. It was only then revealed to the Emperor that a male heir, the future Hongzhi Emperor, was secretly saved and raised in a secure location outside the palace. After reuniting with the young prince, Zhu Youcheng was created crown prince. Consort Wan died in 1487, and shortly after, the Chenghua Emperor died in the same year, after 23 years on the throne. He was buried in the Maoling Mausoleum of the Ming tombs.

Legacy

The Chenghua Emperor's reign can be distinguished by his early attempts to reform the government and trying his best to rule the country. His reign also saw a cultural flourishing with famous persons such as Hu Juren and Chen Baisha dominating the academic scene. However, the Chenghua Emperor's reign was prone to dominating individuals in the government and the emperor was easily influenced into granting favours based on who he liked rather than their abilities. This led to the degradation of the ruling class and wasteful spending by corrupt individuals which eventually depleted the Ming government's coffers.

Family
Consorts and Issue:
 Deposed Empress, of the Wu clan (d. 1509)
 Empress Xiaozhenchun, of the Wang clan (d. 1518)
 Empress Xiaomu, of the Ji clan (1451 – July 1475), personal name Tangmei
 Zhu Youcheng, the Hongzhi Emperor (30 July 1470 – 9 June 1505), third son
 Empress Xiaohui, of the Shao clan (d. 1522)
 Zhu Youyuan, Emperor Ruizong (22 July 1476 – 13 July 1519), fourth son (father of the Jiajing Emperor)
 Zhu Youlun, Prince Hui of Qi (12 November 1478 – 2 December 1501), fifth son
 Zhu Youyun, Prince Jing of Yong (29 June 1481 – 17 January 1507), eighth son
 Imperial Noble Consort Gongsu, of the Wan clan (1428–1487), personal name Zhen'er
 First son (14 February 1466 – November 1466)
 Consort Duanshunxian, of the Bo clan (d. 1527)
 Zhu Youji, Crown Prince Daogong (7 June 1469 – 5 March 1472), second son
 Consort Zhuangjingshun, of the Wang clan (22 April 1448 – 9 January 1495)
 Princess Renhe (1476–1544), first daughter
 Married Qi Shimei (d. 1503) in 1489, and had issue (five sons)
 Consort Gonghuihe, of the Liang clan (d. 1533)
 Consort Duanrongzhao, of the Wang clan
 Consort Jingshunhui, of the Guo clan (d. 1491)
 Princess Yongkang (1478–1547), second daughter
 Married Cui Yuan in 1493, and had issue (two sons, two daughters)
 Consort Zhuangyide, of the Zhang clan (d. 1497)
 Zhu Youbin, Prince Duan of Yi (26 January 1479 – 5 October 1539), sixth son
 Zhu Youhui, Prince Gong of Heng (8 December 1479 – 30 August 1538), seventh son
 Zhu Youpeng, Prince An of Ru (13 October 1484 – 1541), 11th son
 Consort Duanyi'an, of the Yao clan (d. 1491)
 Zhu Youzhi, Prince Ding of Shou (2 December 1481 – 1545), ninth son
 Consort Ronghuigong, of the Yang clan
 Zhu Youshun, Prince Jian of Jing (31 March 1485 – 10 July 1537), 12th son
 Zhu Youkai, Prince Yi of Shen (3 February 1487 – 20 August 1503), 14th son
 Consort Kangshunduan, of the Pan clan (d. 1538)
 Zhu Youshu, Prince Zhuang of Rong (22 January 1486 – 16 February 1539), 13th son
 Consort Gongyijing, of the Wang clan (1465–1510)
 Tenth son (19 August 1483 – 8 October 1483)
 Consort Zhaoshunli, of the Zhang clan (d. 1501)
 Princess Deqing (17 August 1478 – 17 July 1549), third daughter
 Married Lin Yue (d. 1518) in 1496, and had issue (two sons)
 Consort Hehuijing, of the Yue clan (1465–1534)
 Princess Xianyou (d. 1492), sixth daughter
 Consort Jingxirong, of the Tang clan (d. 1524)
 Unknown
 Fourth daughter
 Princess Changtai (d. 1487), fifth daughter

Ancestry

See also
 Chinese emperors family tree (late)

References

¹ Imperial China – 900–1800, F.W. Mote, Page 630, First Harvard University Press, 2003.

|-

|-

|-

 

1447 births
1487 deaths
Ming dynasty emperors
15th-century Chinese monarchs